These 309 species are among more than 700 that belong to the genus Strongylium, darkling beetles.

Strongylium species

 Strongylium acraeum Garrido & Armas, 2012
 Strongylium akitai Masumoto, 1998
 Strongylium akiyamai Masumoto, 2003
 Strongylium albopilosum Gebien, 1913
 Strongylium algoense 
 Strongylium alishanum Masumoto, 1981
 Strongylium amethystinum 
 Strongylium andoi Masumoto, 1996
 Strongylium angustissimum Pic, 1922
 Strongylium anmashanum Masumoto, Akita & Lee, 2008
 Strongylium anthrax Schwarz
 Strongylium apache Triplehorn & Spilman, 1973
 Strongylium atrum Champion, 1887
 Strongylium attapuense Masumoto & Akita, 2013
 Strongylium aulicum 
 Strongylium auratopubens Pic, 1922
 Strongylium auratum (Laporte, 1840)
 Strongylium auspicatum 
 Strongylium azureum (Germar, 1823)
 Strongylium baetianum Garrido & Armas, 2012
 Strongylium basiclavis Zayas, 1988
 Strongylium becvari Masumoto, 1998
 Strongylium belti Champion, 1888
 Strongylium bicarinatoides Kaszab
 Strongylium bifasciatum Maklin, 1864
 Strongylium bilineatocolle Pic, 1918
 Strongylium bilyi Masumoto, 1998
 Strongylium birmanicum Masumoto, 1998
 Strongylium bivittatum Champion, 1888
 Strongylium blairi Gebien, 1920
 Strongylium bolikhamsaiense Masumoto & Akita, 2012
 Strongylium bremeri Masumoto, 1998
 Strongylium brevipes Champion, 1888
 Strongylium burckhardti Masumoto, 2003
 Strongylium caelatum 
 Strongylium canaliculatum Champion, 1887
 Strongylium carbonarium Gebien, 1913
 Strongylium carinipenne Champion, 1888
 Strongylium carinulatum Mäklin, 1864
 Strongylium cayennense Mäklin, 1864
 Strongylium chalcopterum Mäklin, 1864
 Strongylium champasakense Masumoto & Akita, 2013
 Strongylium championi Gebien, 1948
 Strongylium chiangdaoense Masumoto, 1996
 Strongylium chihpenense Masumoto, 2005c
 Strongylium chiriquense Champion, 1887
 Strongylium chontalense Champion, 1887
 Strongylium chutungense Masumoto, 2005c
 Strongylium cicindeliforme Masumoto, 1998
 Strongylium clauda (Gebien, 1913)
 Strongylium clavicorne Champion, 1893
 Strongylium cochinchinense Masumoto, 1997
 Strongylium coeruleipes Pic, 1940
 Strongylium colombianum Champion, 1888
 Strongylium compactum 
 Strongylium conradti Champion, 1893
 Strongylium costaricense Champion, 1888
 Strongylium costipenne Mäklin, 1864
 Strongylium crassicorne Champion, 1887
 Strongylium crenatum Maklin
 Strongylium crockerense Masumoto, 1997
 Strongylium crurale Fairmaire, 1893
 Strongylium cultellatum 
 Strongylium cupeyal Zayas, 1988
 Strongylium cupricolle Mäklin, 1864
 Strongylium cuproso Garrido, 2004
 Strongylium curticorne Champion, 1888
 Strongylium cyaneomaculatum Pic, 1918
 Strongylium cyaneum 
 Strongylium delauneyi Fleutiaux
 Strongylium dembickyi Masumoto, 1998
 Strongylium dentatum Champion, 1887
 Strongylium dilutipes Masumoto & Akita, 2011
 Strongylium discrepans 
 Strongylium doipuiense Masumoto, 1996
 Strongylium doisuthepense Masumoto, 1996
 Strongylium elongatum Garrido & Armas, 2012
 Strongylium emasense Masumoto & Akita, 2011
 Strongylium endoi Masumoto, 1982
 Strongylium erraticum Champion, 1888
 Strongylium erythrocephalum (Fabricius, 1801)
 Strongylium erythropterum Mäklin, 1864
 Strongylium exaratum Champion, 1887
 Strongylium excavatipenne Pic, 1918
 Strongylium fangense Masumoto, 1996
 Strongylium fasciolatum Mäklin, 1864
 Strongylium formosanum Gebien, 1913
 Strongylium fossulatum 
 Strongylium fragile Champion, 1888
 Strongylium frontale Champion, 1888
 Strongylium fujitai Masumoto, 1981
 Strongylium gibbum Mäklin, 1867
 Strongylium girardianum Masumoto, 1996
 Strongylium grande Pic, 1935
 Strongylium gravidum Mäklin, 1864
 Strongylium gregarium Champion, 1888
 Strongylium guadeloupense Gebien, 1911
 Strongylium haucki Masumoto & Akita, 2013
 Strongylium hemistriatum Triplehorn & Spilman, 1973
 Strongylium hideoi Masumoto, 1996
 Strongylium hirasawai Masumoto, 1996
 Strongylium hmongense Masumoto, 1998
 Strongylium hoepfneri 
 Strongylium holzschuhi Masumoto & Akita, 2012
 Strongylium horaki Masumoto, 1998
 Strongylium horni Oertzen, 1903
 Strongylium hsiaoi Masumoto, Akita & Lee, 2008
 Strongylium huaianaense Masumoto & Akita, 2011
 Strongylium huaipoense Masumoto, 1998
 Strongylium ignitum Champion, 1887
 Strongylium imitator 
 Strongylium indigeus 
 Strongylium indignum Gebien, 1920
 Strongylium insulare 
 Strongylium iricolor Ardoin, 1973
 Strongylium ishizakii Masumoto, 2003
 Strongylium itoi Masumoto, 1998
 Strongylium jae Masumoto, 1996
 Strongylium kalimantanense Masumoto, 1997
 Strongylium kambaitiense Masumoto, 1998
 Strongylium kanchanaburiense Masumoto, 1998
 Strongylium kariangense Masumoto, 1998
 Strongylium katsumii Masumoto, 1999
 Strongylium keningauense Masumoto, 1997
 Strongylium kenokokense Masumoto, 1998
 Strongylium kentingense Masumoto, 1981
 Strongylium kerleyi Masumoto, 1996
 Strongylium khamense Masumoto & Akita, 2014
 Strongylium khammouanense Masumoto & Akita, 2012
 Strongylium khaolakense Masumoto & Akita, 2011
 Strongylium khaosoidaoense Masumoto, 2003
 Strongylium khasinamtanoon Masumoto & Akita, 2012
 Strongylium kimanisense Masumoto, 1997
 Strongylium kingdonwardi Masumoto, 1998
 Strongylium klapperichi 
 Strongylium kohanemum Masumoto, 1998
 Strongylium kokoae Masumoto & Akita, 2013
 Strongylium kondoi Masumoto & Akita, 2011
 Strongylium krali Masumoto, 2003
 Strongylium kuantouense Masumoto, 2005c
 Strongylium laetum 
 Strongylium lanathai Masumoto, 1996
 Strongylium langurioides Champion, 1888
 Strongylium lanhai Masumoto, Akita & Lee, 2013
 Strongylium laocrurale Masumoto & Akita, 2012
 Strongylium laonouaum Masumoto & Akita, 2014
 Strongylium laotaicrurale Masumoto & Akita, 2013
 Strongylium laszlorum Masumoto, 2005c
 Strongylium lautum 
 Strongylium liangi Yuan & Ren, 2014
 Strongylium lini Masumoto, Akita & Lee, 2008
 Strongylium lishanum Gebien, 1981
 Strongylium lisuense Masumoto, 1998
 Strongylium longissimum Gebien, 1913
 Strongylium lumulumuense Masumoto, 1998
 Strongylium lutaoense Masumoto, 1992
 Strongylium maculicolle Champion, 1887
 Strongylium maehongsonense Masumoto, 1998
 Strongylium maisi Garrido, 2004
 Strongylium majeri Masumoto, 2003
 Strongylium maleengthai Masumoto, 1996
 Strongylium masatakai Masumoto Lee & Akita, 2007
 Strongylium meengsiikiaum Masumoto & Akita, 2014
 Strongylium meengsiitongum Masumoto & Akita, 2014
 Strongylium meengyoaum Masumoto & Akita, 2014
 Strongylium merkli Masumoto, 1998
 Strongylium miikhonum Masumoto, 1996
 Strongylium mindanaoense Masumoto, 1997
 Strongylium mirabile Linell
 Strongylium misantlae Champion, 1888
 Strongylium miwai Masumoto, 1996
 Strongylium miyakei Masumoto, 1997
 Strongylium montebarreto Garrido, 2004
 Strongylium moritai Masumoto, 1998
 Strongylium moroninum Pic, 1918
 Strongylium mucronatum Mäklin, 1864
 Strongylium naamum Masumoto & Akita, 2011
 Strongylium nakaiense Masumoto & Akita, 2012
 Strongylium nakanei Masumoto, 1981
 Strongylium nakpraati Masumoto, 1996
 Strongylium namnaonis Masumoto, 2003
 Strongylium namthaense Masumoto & Akita, 2012
 Strongylium nanfangum Masumoto, 1982
 Strongylium nangbangense Masumoto, 1998
 Strongylium nanrenense Masumoto, Akita & Lee, 2012
 Strongylium nayoiense Masumoto & Akita, 2011
 Strongylium ngaiense Masumoto & Akita, 2011
 Strongylium nigrum Zayas, 1988
 Strongylium nitidiceps Champion, 1888
 Strongylium nobile Maklin, 1864
 Strongylium noi Masumoto, 1998
 Strongylium norikoae Masumoto & Akita, 2012
 Strongylium ochii Masumoto, 1992
 Strongylium oculatum Champion, 1888
 Strongylium ohbayashiianum Masumoto & Akita, 2014
 Strongylium ohmomoi Masumoto, Akita & Lee, 2013
 Strongylium okajimai Masumoto, 2003
 Strongylium okumurai Masumoto, 1981
 Strongylium opacipenne Champion, 1888
 Strongylium osawai Masumoto, 2005c
 Strongylium ovampoense 
 Strongylium pacholatkoi Masumoto, 1998
 Strongylium paddai Ivie & Triplehorn, 1986
 Strongylium pai Masumoto, 1998
 Strongylium pakanense Masumoto & Akita, 2014
 Strongylium pakchongense Masumoto & Akita, 2011
 Strongylium pakseum Masumoto & Akita, 2013
 Strongylium palawanense Masumoto, 1997
 Strongylium palingense Masumoto, 2005c
 Strongylium palopoense Masumoto & Akita, 2011
 Strongylium panamense Champion, 1888
 Strongylium pangkorense Masumoto & Akita, 2011
 Strongylium papuense 
 Strongylium perakense Masumoto & Akita, 2011
 Strongylium perturbator 
 Strongylium phaknabense Masumoto & Akita, 2011
 Strongylium phedongense Masumoto, 1998
 Strongylium phomae Masumoto, 1996
 Strongylium phonsavanense Masumoto & Akita, 2012
 Strongylium phousamsounense Masumoto & Akita, 2012
 Strongylium phoutonmonense Masumoto & Akita, 2012
 Strongylium phraense Masumoto, 1996
 Strongylium phuchongense Masumoto & Akita, 2011
 Strongylium pici Masumoto, 1998
 Strongylium pilifasciatum Masumoto, 1998
 Strongylium plausible 
 Strongylium preciosus Zayas, 1988
 Strongylium pseudogibbosipenne Masumoto, 1981
 Strongylium pumilum Garrido & Armas, 2012
 Strongylium punctipes Champion, 1888
 Strongylium purpureopunctum Pic, 1918
 Strongylium purpuripenne Mäklin, 1864
 Strongylium putaoense Masumoto & Akita, 2011
 Strongylium quisqueyanum Garrido & Armas, 2012
 Strongylium ratchashimaense Masumoto & Akita, 2011
 Strongylium rhodesianum 
 Strongylium roifeedaatum Masumoto, 1996
 Strongylium roiyonum Masumoto, 1996
 Strongylium rufabdominale Masumoto, 1998
 Strongylium rufifemoratum Masumoto, 1997
 Strongylium rufovittatum Pic, 1932
 Strongylium sabahense Masumoto, 1997
 Strongylium sabahinsigne Masumoto, 1997
 Strongylium sakaii Masumoto, 1998
 Strongylium salueiense Masumoto & Akita, 2013
 Strongylium salvazai Masumoto & Akita, 2011
 Strongylium saracenum (Reiche & Saulcy, 1857)
 Strongylium sawaiae Masumoto, 1996
 Strongylium schawalleri Masumoto, 2003
 Strongylium scheknlingi Gebien, 1913
 Strongylium schneideri Masumoto, 1998
 Strongylium semiopacum Pic, 1918
 Strongylium shigeoi Masumoto, Akita & Lee, 2008
 Strongylium shimomurai Masumoto, 1998
 Strongylium siichaum Masumoto & Akita, 2014
 Strongylium siidemum Masumoto, 1996
 Strongylium siidum Masumoto, 1998
 Strongylium siisuai Masumoto, 1996
 Strongylium simplicicolle LeConte, 1878
 Strongylium simplicipes Pic, 1918
 Strongylium sinuatipenne Miwa, 1939
 Strongylium siphangngense Masumoto, 2003
 Strongylium snizeki Masumoto & Akita, 2011
 Strongylium sodongense Masumoto & Akita, 2011
 Strongylium soncai Masumoto, 1996
 Strongylium soppongense Masumoto, 1998
 Strongylium sparseimpressum Pic, 1922
 Strongylium spec Masumoto & Akita, 2011
 Strongylium strbahergovisorum Masumoto & Akita, 2012
 Strongylium subalternatum Pic, 1918
 Strongylium sulawesiense Masumoto, 1997
 Strongylium sumikoae Masumoto, Akita & Lee, 2014
 Strongylium suspicax 
 Strongylium szentivanyi Kaszab, 1941
 Strongylium tabanai Masumoto, 1998
 Strongylium takeshianum Masumoto & Akita, 2011
 Strongylium tanikadoi Masumoto, 1998
 Strongylium taoi Masumoto, 1996
 Strongylium tehuashense Masumoto, 2005c
 Strongylium tenuicolle (Say)
 Strongylium terminatum (Say)
 Strongylium thangonense Masumoto & Akita, 2014
 Strongylium tinctipes Champion, 1887
 Strongylium trifasciatum Masumoto, 1998
 Strongylium tsurui Masumoto, 2003
 Strongylium tsuyukii Masumoto, 1996
 Strongylium turquinense Zayas, 1988
 Strongylium umphangense Masumoto, 2003
 Strongylium variicorne Champion, 1887
 Strongylium ventrale Champion, 1888
 Strongylium venustum Zayas, 1988
 Strongylium verde Garrido & Armas, 2012
 Strongylium vikenae Ferrer
 Strongylium virescens Zayas, 1988
 Strongylium viride Fabricius, 1801
 Strongylium viridimembris Pic, 1922
 Strongylium viriditinctum Champion, 1888
 Strongylium wadai Masumoto, 2005c
 Strongylium wallacei Masumoto, 1997
 Strongylium wiseetingum Masumoto, 1997
 Strongylium woodruffi Garrido & Armas, 2012
 Strongylium xiengkouangense Masumoto & Akita, 2013
 Strongylium yai Masumoto, 1998
 Strongylium yalaense Masumoto & Akita, 2011
 Strongylium yamasakoi Masumoto & Akita, 2013
 Strongylium yasuhikoi Masumoto, 1996
 Strongylium yokoyamai Masumoto, 1981
 Strongylium yukae Masumoto, 1996
 Strongylium zoltani Masumoto, 1981

References

Strongylium